Navobod is a jamoat in Tajikistan. It is part of the city of Tursunzoda in Districts of Republican Subordination. The jamoat has a total population of 36,979 (2015).

References

Populated places in Districts of Republican Subordination
Jamoats of Tajikistan